is a Quaternary stratovolcano located off the coast of Hokkaidō, Japan in the Sea of Japan. It rises out of the Sea of Japan forming Rishiri Island. Because its cone shape resembles Mount Fuji it is sometimes referred to as Rishiri Fuji. It is one of the 100 famous mountains in Japan.

Mount Rishiri's opening festival is held annually on July 2 and July 3. This festival officially opens the climbing season.

Geology
Mount Rishiri is made up of alkali and non-alkali mafic volcanic rock dating from the Late Pleistocene, 130,000–18,000 years ago. Otherwise it is covered in Quaternary volcanic rock debris.

Climbing route
The ascent of Rishiri is not suitable for novice hikers, because it is challenging in places.  There is a campsite partway up the mountain from the dock, and an unmanned hut located a short distance below the summit.  There is also a small shrine at the summit.  On clear days the view extends to Hokkaidō, the adjacent island of Rebun, and as far as Sakhalin Island in Russia.

In popular culture
The package of Shiroi Koibito includes a picture of Mount Rishiri arranged in the centre.

Gallery

References

External links 

 Rishirizan - Japan Meteorological Agency 
  - Japan Meteorological Agency
 Rishiri Zan - Geological Survey of Japan
 

Mountains of Hokkaido
Stratovolcanoes of Japan
Volcanoes of Hokkaido
Highest points of Japanese national parks
Pleistocene stratovolcanoes
Holocene stratovolcanoes

fr:Rishiri